The Ratlam - Bhind Express is an express train service which runs between Ratlam Junction railway station of Ratlam of Central India state of Madhya Pradesh and Bhind railway station near Gwalior, the other important city of the same state.

Number and nomenclature
The number provided for the service is
21126 – From Bhind to Ratlam
21125 – From Ratlam to Bhind

Coach composite

The train generally consist of 17 Coaches as follows :
1 AC 2 Tier
2 AC 3 Tier
8 Sleeper Coach
4 Second Class Coaches
2 Luggage cum Parcel

Route and halts

The train goes via Barnagar, Indore, Dewas, Ujjain, Maksi, Guna, Shivpuri and Gwalior. Malanpur.Soni and Bhind

See also
Bhopal–Gwalior Intercity Express
Indore–Amritsar Express
Indore–Bhopal Intercity Express

References

External links
 
 

Rail transport in Madhya Pradesh
Transport in Ratlam
Express trains in India